The Hallstrom House (also known as the Hallstrom Farmstead) is a historic house in Vero Beach, Florida. It is located at 1723 Southwest Old Dixie Highway.

Description and history 
Beginning as a  pineapple plantation in 1909 the main house was erected by Swedish horticulturist Axel Hallström. With help from Norse and Swedish craftsmen, the structure was completed in 1918. Later on, after Axel moved on to the citrus business, he eventually moved out. After Axel Hallström's death in 1966, his daughter continued the citrus business until the 1980s. In July 2000, efforts to preserve the remaining  plantation were achieved when Ruth Hallström willed them for the sole purpose of preserving the farmhouse. On June 6, 2002, the farmhouse was added to the United States National Register of Historic Places.

References

External links

 Environmental Planning Section - Hallstrom Farmstead at Indian River County Board of County Commissioners
 Indian River County listings  at Florida's Office of Cultural and Historical Programs

Houses on the National Register of Historic Places in Florida
National Register of Historic Places in Indian River County, Florida
Buildings and structures in Vero Beach, Florida
Houses in Indian River County, Florida
1918 establishments in Florida
Houses completed in 1918
Vernacular architecture in Florida